Intejocerida is the name given to a group of generally straight shelled nautiloid cephalopods originally found in Lower and Middle Ordovician sediments in the Angara River basin in Russia; defined in the Treatise as an order, and combined there with the Endocerida in the Endoceratoidea.

Diagnosis 
Members of the Intejocerida are typically straight shelled with large siphuncles that vary in position from ventral to central, in which septal necks from very short to holochoanitic and connecting rings from moderately thick to apparently thin. Common to all, and the character by which the order was defined, are deposits within the siphuncle that have been described as longitudinal, radially arranged, calcareous lamellae.

Taxonomy

Taxonomic relations 
Flower (1976) pointed out that not only does the Intejocerida contain two groups, one with Intejoceras and Bajkaloceras with central siphuncles, the other with Envencoceras, Padunoceras, and a third genus Rossoceras, but that combining it with the Endocerida in the Endoceratoidea, makes the latter polyphyletic and therefore an invalid taxon.

Derivation 
Intejoceras and Bajkaloceras can be reasonably derived from the Baltoceratidae or less likely from the Troedssonellidae. Evencoceras, Rossoceras, and Padunoceras have their  probable origin in the Proterocameroceratidae and are retained with the endocerids.

References

 Flower, R.H. 1976. Some Whiterock and Chazy Endoceroids. Part II, Mem.28; New Mexico Bureau of Mines and Mineral Resources, 1976.
 Techert, C. 1964. Endoceratoidea. Treatise on Invertebrate Paleontology, Park K. Teichert & Moore (eds). Geological Society of America and Univ Kansas Press.

Prehistoric nautiloids
Prehistoric cephalopod orders